Robert Muir "Bob" Graves (September 24, 1930 – June 28, 2003) was an American landscape and golf course architect who was president of the American Society of Golf Course Architects from 1974–75. Graves designed many golf courses, including golf courses in California, Idaho, Montana, Nevada, Oregon, Utah, Washington, British Columbia and Malaysia.

Early life and education 
Robert Muir Graves was born on September 24, 1930 in Trenton, Michigan, United States. He was the son of Orin Nelson Graves (1901–1980) and Margaret J. Muir (1902–1987). He had two siblings, a brother and a sister. Graves studied at Michigan State University and graduated from University of California, Berkeley with a degree in landscape architecture. Serving in the United States Navy during the Korean War, and 22 years in the Naval Reserves, he achieved the rank of Commander.

In 1952, while living in Berkeley, California, he married Maryalice "Mimi" Rowland (born 1933). Graves was a multi-faceted man whose interests included flying (both for business and pleasure), music, and a wide range of sports, including golf, skiing and horseback riding.

Architecture 

Graves began his career in 1955 as a landscape architect before transitioning into golf course architecture. His first project as a golf course architect was redesign of the Carmel Valley Country Club in Carmel-by-the-Sea, California and Big Canyon Country Club in Newport Beach, California. He designed over 75 golf courses around the world, but his best-known work is located in the western United States. In 1972, he designed the Big Meadow course at Black Butte Ranch in Oregon.

His Sea Ranch Golf Links was opened in the early 1970s and recognized as a "natural" and "minimalist" golf course architecture piece. Graves also designed Port Ludlow Golf Course and Canterwood Country Club in Washington state. One of his masterpieces, completed in 1978, was the Championship 18 Course at Buffalo Hill Golf Club in Kalispell, Montana. Graves became the President of the American Society of Golf Course Architects in 1974 and served until 1975.

In 2002, Graves and his good friend Geoffrey Cornish published a book called Classic Golf Hole Design: Using the Greatest Holes as Inspiration for Modern Courses.

List of golf courses in the United States 

Avalon Golf Links – North/West Course in Burlington, Washington
Avalon Golf Links – South/North Course in Burlington, Washington
Avalon Golf Links – West/South Course in Burlington, Washington
Baywood Golf & Country Club – Private Golf course in Arcata, California
Big Canyon Country Club – Private in Newport Beach, California
Big Meadow at Black Butte Ranch – Resort in Black Butte Ranch, Oregon
Bigwood Golf Course – Public in Ketchum, Idaho
Bill Roberts Municipal Golf Course – Public in Helena, Montana
Blackberry Farm Golf Course – Public in Cupertino, California
Boundary Oak Golf Course – Public in Walnut Creek, California
Brooktrails Golf Course – Public in Willits, California
Buchanan Fields Golf Course – Public in Concord, California
Buffalo Hill Golf Club (Championship Course) – Public in Kalispell, Montana
Canterwood Golf Club – Private in Gig Harbor, Washington
Casper Golf Club – Highlands/Links Course in Casper, Wyoming
Casper Golf Club – Highlands/Park Course in Casper, Wyoming
Cedar Hills Golf Club in Cedar Hills, Utah
Chalk Mountain Golf Course – Public in Atascadero, California
Cherry Island Golf Course – Public in Elverta, California
Chuck Corica Golf Complex – The Jack Clark South Course in Alameda, California
Contra Costa Country Club – Private in Pleasant Hill, California
Diablo Creek Golf Course – Public in Concord, California
Diablo Hills Golf Course – Public in Walnut Creek, California
East at Blue Rock Springs Golf Course – Public in Vallejo, California
Eighteen Hole at Villages Golf & Country Club – Private in San Jose, California
El Cariso Golf Course – Public in Sylmar, California
Executive at Las Positas Golf Course – Public in Livermore, California
Franklin Canyon Golf Course – Public in Hercules, California
Glen Annie Golf Club in Goleta, California
Illahe Hills Country Club in Salem, Oregon
Jackpot Golf Club – Resort in Jackpot, Nevada
La Purisima Golf Course – Public in Lompoc, California
La Rinconada Country Club – Private in Los Gatos, California
Lake Merced Golf & Country Club – Private in Daly City, California
Logan River Golf Course – Public in Logan, Utah
Maderas Golf Club in Poway, California
Meadow Springs Country Club – Private in Richland, Washington
MeadowWood Golf Course – Public in Liberty Lake, Washington
Monterey Pines Golf Course in Monterey, California
Moraga Country Club – Private in Moraga, California
Mountain Springs Golf & Country Club – Semi-Private in Sonora, California
Murray Parkway Golf Course – Public in Murray, Utah
Northstar at Tahoe Golf Course – Resort in Truckee, California
Overlake Golf & Country Club – Private in Medina, Washington
Pajaro Valley Golf Club – Public in Royal Oaks, California
Palo Alto Hills Golf & Country Club – Private in Palo Alto, California
Paradise Valley Golf Course – Public in Fairfield, California
Pittsburg's Delta View Golf Course – Public in Pittsburg, California
Quail Lodge Resort & Golf Club – Resort in Carmel, California
Rancho del Pueblo Golf Course in San Jose, California
Regulation at Las Positas Golf Course – Public in Livermore, California
Rio Bravo Country Club – Private in Bakersfield, California
River's Edge Golf Course – Public in Bend, Oregon
Rossmoor Golf Club – The Dollar Ranch Golf Course in Walnut Creek, California
Salinas Fairways Golf Course – Public in Salinas, California
San Geronimo Golf Club – Public in San Geronimo, California
San Jose Municipal Golf Course – Public in San Jose, California
San Luis Obispo Golf & Country Club – Private in San Luis Obispo, California
Santa Clara Golf & Tennis Club – Public in Santa Clara, California
Saticoy Country Club – Private in Somis, California
Sea Ranch Lodge & Golf Links, The – Public in Sea Ranch, California
Seven Oaks Country Club – Island/Oaks Course in Bakersfield, California
Seven Oaks Country Club – Lakes/Island Course in Bakersfield, California
Short Nine at Villages Golf & Country Club – Private in San Jose, California
St. Stanislaus Golf Course – Public in Ceres, California
Sun Willows Golf Course – Public in Pasco, Washington
Swenson Executive at Swenson Park Golf Course – Public in Stockton, California
The Executive Nine at Palm Desert Country Club – Semi-Private in Palm Desert, California
The Greens at Redmond – Redmond, Oregon
Thunder Canyon Country Club – Private in Washoe Valley, Nevada
Tide/Timber at Port Ludlow Resort – Resort in Port Ludlow, Washington
Timber/Trail at Port Ludlow Resort – Resort in Port Ludlow, Washington
Trail/Tide at Port Ludlow Resort – Resort in Port Ludlow, Washington
Twin Lakes Golf Course – Public in Saint George, Utah
Van Buskirk Park Golf Course – Public in Stockton, California
Westridge Golf Club – Public in La Habra, California
Widgi Creek Golf Club – Semi-Private in Bend, Oregon
Woodcreek Golf Club – Public in Roseville, California

List of international golf courses 

Furry Creek Golf and Country Club in Furry Creek, British Columbia, Canada
Sabah Golf & Country Club in Sabah, Malaysia
Kinabalu Golf Club in Sabah, Malaysia

Personal life and death 
Graves was married to Maryalice "Mimi" Graves (née Roland) and had three daughters, Victoria Graves, Elizabeth "Betsy" Mahan, and Kathryn "Katy" Yoder. He died on June 28, 2003, in Bend, Oregon due to complications from cancer.

References 

1930 births
2003 deaths
20th-century American architects
Golf course architects
People from Trenton, Michigan
UC Berkeley College of Environmental Design alumni
20th-century American male writers